Selkuniq was a region and family of the old Armenia c. 300–800.

Around 325 it was ruled by Mamikonian, but c. 390 was in the hands of the local family. Airouk Selkuniqtsi ruled it c. 451.

See also
List of regions of old Armenia

Early medieval Armenian regions